The Hatherleigh CAVOK is a Swiss mid-wing, single-seat motor glider that was produced by Heatherleigh Consulting of Bussigny-près-Lausanne, first flying on 13 December 2001.

The aircraft's name is a common aviation meteorology abbreviation meaning Ceiling And Visibility OK and implying good flying weather.

Design and development
The CAVOK project began in the middle of 2000. The design goals for the aircraft included maximizing performance for the price, compliance with JAR 22 rules for standard class sailplanes and also European ultralight category rules, including French ULM regulations. Certification was also intended to JAR-VLA standards for countries that lack an ultralight category.

The aircraft is built from fibreglass and features a fixed, fuselage-mounted, single-cylinder, two-stroke Gas Gas motorcycle engine, driving a retractable two-bladed fixed-pitch tractor propeller. The engine can be started and run before extending and engaging the propeller. The wing features flaperons and, unlike most other aircraft in this category, lacks wing-mounted air brakes, the brake being fuselage mounted. The landing gear consists of fixed nose, centre and tail wheels along with auxiliary wheels  out on the wing from the fuselage. The aircraft is finished in white polyurethane paint.

The aircraft is normally transported by towed trailer.

The last news release the company put out, on 14 December 2002, indicated that development work had been delayed, but was underway at that time. The company website had been removed by 2005 and it is likely that only prototypes were completed and flown.

Specifications (CAVOK 10)

See also

References

External links
CAVOK first flight photos

2000s Swiss sailplanes